Tuyển sinh đại học và cao đẳng (full name: Kỳ thi tuyển sinh đại học và cao đẳng) is a common exam to get input for universities and colleges in Vietnam. The test by the Ministry of Education and Training Vietnam held annually, immediately after high school graduation exam (thi tốt nghiệp) about a month. In recent years, the exam date fixed schedule follows:

Session 1: July 4 and 5: test for block A and block V.
Session 2: July 9 and 10: test for blocks B, C, D, N, H, T, R, S, M.
Session 3: July 15 and 16: test for college.

Contestant
Who has a high school graduation certificates or equivalent level study (supplementary, secondary vocational).

Test blocks and test subjects
Basic blocks:
 Block A: Mathematics, Physics, Chemistry
 Block A1: Mathematics, Physics, English language
 Block B: Mathematics, Chemistry, Biology
 Block C: Literature, History, Geography
 Block D1: Literature, Mathematics, English language
 Block D2: Literature, Mathematics, Russian language
 Block D3: Literature, Mathematics, French language
 Block D4: Literature, Mathematics, Chinese language
 Block D5: Literature, Mathematics, German language
 Block D6: Literature, Mathematics, Japanese language

Gifted blocks:
 Block H: Literature, Gifted Art (graphics and drawing with pencil decorating color)
 Block K: Mathematics, Physics, Engineering profession
 Block M: Literature, Mathematics, Gifted (singing, storytelling, expressive reading)
 Block N: Literature, 2 Gifted Music (work evaluation, details, vocals)
 Block R: Literature, History, Gifted
 Block S: Literature, 2 Gifted Theatre Arts (Bodily Movements, Vocals, Acting)
 Block T: Biology, Mathematics, Gifted Sports (running a short distance, turn on the spot, bent body, required physique measurements)
 Block V: Mathematics, Physics, Drawing Art

Each subject is graded on a 10-mark scale.

Form test
Prior to 2001, each institution conducted its own entrance exams under the supervision of the Ministry of Education. Accordingly, candidates who registered for the exams at many schools must go through each school's exams. Since 2001, the Ministry of Education has begun to conduct a single exam, and the results would be applied to all schools that candidates have registered. 

Since 2007, the form of objective test applied to the four subjects: physics, chemistry, biology and foreign languages; four subjects:  mathematics, literature, history and geography are in essay format.

Education in Vietnam